Hugo Sigman (born 1 January 1944) is an Argentine psychiatrist and business mogul. He is the founder, CEO and –jointly with his wife, biochemist Silvia Gold— the only shareholder of Grupo Insud, a business conglomerate with a presence in the fields of pharmaceuticals, agroforestry, cinema, nature and design.

Early life, education and psychiatry
Hugo Sigman was born in Buenos Aires, Argentina on 1 January 1944. He graduated from the medical school of the University of Buenos Aires in 1969. The same year, he finished his studies in social psychology at the university under Enrique Pichon-Rivière. Sigman completed his residency at Aráoz Alfaro Hospital in Buenos Aires Province.

In 1970, he joined the Psychiatry Service of Policlínico Lanús as resident. He continued his career, first as Chief of Residents, and then as founder and director of the Psychiatric Emergency Unit at the same hospital. In 1976, Sigman fled to Spain following the Argentine coup d'état. He worked at the Psychiatry Service of Hospital Clínico de Barcelona.

Business career
In 1978, Sigman and his wife, biochemist Silvia Gold, received a loan of US$400,000 from his father-in-law, Roberto Gold, a businessman in the pharmaceutical industry in Argentina. The couple co-founded Chemo Group, a chemical-pharmaceutical company, and the first company in what would later become Grupo Insud.

In the 1980s, Sigman and his family moved back to Argentina, where he developed his existing businesses and developed new work areas.

Life sciences
Sigman's professional career relies especially on Human Sciences, where, through Insud Pharma (also known as Insud Group), he has developed three companies:

 Chemo: a company that produces active pharmaceutical ingredients (APIs) and finished dosage forms (FDFs) to 1,200 pharmaceutical companies around the world, with 15 manufacturing R&D centers 
 Exeltis: a company that offers female health products in more than 40 countries
 mAbxience: a biotech company created in 2008, which produces biosimilar medicines

In 2011, Sigman founded, together with other renowned biotechnology companies, the Argentine Chamber of Biotechnology, with the aim of strengthening the public-private collaboration in biotechnology and encouraging its development in the region.

The Public-Private Consortium for Research and Development of Innovative Oncology Therapies, developed the first therapeutic vaccine against lung cancer, Racotumomab (Vaxira), introduced in 2013.

Inspired by that model, other partnerships were made with institutions like University of Buenos Aires, Universidad Nacional de Quilmes, Universidad Nacional de San Martín, Roffo and Garrahan Hospitals, Academia Nacional de Medicina, and several foreign universities.

Approximately 250 researchers work at the partnerships supported by the Group, doing basic and applied research; 100 of them are dedicated to the development of products for treating cancer.

Agribusiness
In 1998, he started agricultural and forestry activities in different locations of Argentina, focused on genetic improvement and sustainable production, with companies Garruchos, devoted to farming and cattle-raising; Pomera, ranked as the top Argentine-capital forestry company; and Cabaña Los Murmullos, a cattle breeding ranch.

Sigman is also a shareholder of Bioceres, an Argentine biotechnology company focused on agricultural production. This company developed a gene that enables the production of wheat, corn and soybean resistant to draughts and soil salinity, and has licensed its products to the USA, France and India.

In Argentina's veterinary industry, Grupo Insud partners with Biogénesis Bagó, an animal vaccine production company authorized by the government of China to build a plant in that country.

Communication and art
Sigman co-founded the filmmaking company Kramer & Sigman Films (K&S Films) with Oscar Kramer in 2005. They had previously collaborated on the 2004 film El perro. The company has produced the films On Probation (2005), Chronicle of an Escape (2006), Los Marziano (2010), The Last Elvis (2012), Seventh Floor (2013), Wild Tales (2014), The Clan (2015), The Summit (2017), and Heroic Losers (2019).

Through Grupo Insud, Sigman participates in cultural companies in Argentina and Spain such as the Southern Cone edition of Le Monde diplomatique, the Latin American version of The New York Review of Books, and Capital Intelectual, which includes a line of publications in Spain under the publishing brand Clave Intelectual.

Sigman is an art and culture enthusiast. Between 2010 and 2013, he was a member of the Advisory Council of the National Fine Arts Museum of Argentina. He is a member of the Board of Patronage of Museo Reina Sofía, in Madrid, Spain. Additionally, the venue of Grupo INSUD in Buenos Aires (the traditional Díaz Vélez Palace), built in 1907 and recently restored, has won several architectural awards and has been declared a protected heritage site of Buenos Aires City.

Mundo Sano foundation
Sigman's father-in-law, Roberto Gold, created the non-profit Mundo Sano Foundation in 1993. By the late 1990s, Silvia Gold chaired the foundation, which has funded projects in Argentina, Spain and Ethiopia addressing neglected tropical diseases (NTDs) including Chagas, dengue and soil-transmitted helminths.Chagas disease - inheriting a silent killer BBC

Awards
 In 2008, he received the Merit Diploma at the Konex Awards, in the "Innovative Entrepreneurs" category. 
 In 2009, Sigman took part in the 15th Conference of the Argentine Industrial Union, and was guest speaker representing Argentina at Harvard and Columbia Universities.
 In 2011, jointly with Silvia Gold, he received an award from Asociación de Dirigentes de Empresa (ADE) in the "Agroindustry" category.
 In September 2011, Sigman was guest speaker at the United Nations Conference on Trade and Development held in Geneva, Switzerland. His lecture was about the manufacturing of vaccines and biotechnological products in Argentina. The Sinergium Biotech model of integration for the production of vaccines and biotech products involves technology transfer, export potential and the creation of 320 jobs, said Sigman. 
 In 2012, he was a speaker at the Global Investment Forum, organized by the United Nations in Qatar. He presented the state-of-the-art productive investment model based on partnerships with other pharmaceutical companies and public entities.
 In 2013, at the 11th International Symposium on AIDS, organized by Fundación Huésped, he was recognized for the achievements of the Research, Development and Innovation Consortium presented by his companies.
 In 2013, the Endeavor Foundation named him the "Model Entrepreneur" for his values and track record. 
 In 2015, Sigman received the Entrepreneur of the Year Award, from EY consulting firm (Ernst & Young) in Argentina.
 In 2018, he received his 2nd Merit Diploma at the Konex Awards, this time in the "Industry Entrepreneurs" category.
 In 2019, he received the Trajectory Award of the Rural supplement of the Clarin newspaper during the 133rd Rural Exhibition.

Personal life
Sigman is married to biochemist Silvia Gold. Together, they were ranked the sixth wealthiest people in Argentina by Forbes'' magazine in 2020, with a net worth of US$2 billion. Sigman has three sons—Leandro, Mariano, and Lucas. He is Jewish and a fan of the River Plate football club.

References

External links

 Official website
 Grupo Insud
 Chemo Group
 Exeltis
 mAbxience
 Kramer & Sigman Films
 Editorial Capital intelectual
 Pomera Maderas
 Garruchos
 Solantu
 Yacaré Porá
 Puerto Valle - Hotel de Esteros
 Mundo Sano
 Research, Development and Innovation Consortium
 Argentine Chamber of Biotechnology

1944 births
Argentine businesspeople
Argentine psychiatrists
Argentine pharmacists
Argentine scientists
Argentine Jews
Argentine people of German-Jewish descent
University of Buenos Aires alumni
Living people